Relations between Japanese revolutionaries, the Comintern and the Soviet Union existed from the 1920s until the collapse of the Soviet Union in 1991.

History 
The Comintern made first contact with Japanese revolutionaries in 1920. It helped establish the Japanese Communist Party. 
Both the Comintern and the JCP had close relations. The JCP had financial ties with both the Comintern, and the Soviet government. 

The Soviet Union solicited working-class Japanese to study at the Communist University of the Toilers of the East (KUTV), known as "Kutobe" by the Japanese. 

Many Japanese activists who resided in the Soviet Union became victims of Stalin's Great Purge.

The relationship between the JCP and the Soviet Union deteriorated by the 1960s, when Pro‐Chinese members became the majority of the party.

See also 
 Japan–Soviet Union relations
 Japanese dissidence during the Shōwa period
 Japanese people in Russia

References

Further reading 
 Paul Langer and Rodger Swearingen. "The Japanese Communist Party, the Soviet Union and Korea"  Pacific Affairs . Vol. 23, No. 4 (Dec., 1950).

 
Japanese revolutionaries
Japan–Soviet Union relations
Comintern
Japanese Communist Party